K. J. Yesudas has sung 211 Kannada songs till date. Most of his songs were with singer S. Janaki and composer Hamsalekha.

Film songs

References

Yesudas, K. J.
K. J. Yesudas
Yesudas, K. J.